Phlegmariurus mannii, synonym Huperzia mannii, is a species of lycopod, known by the common names Mann's clubmoss and wawaeiole. It is endemic to Hawaii, where there are only six populations remaining. It is a federally listed endangered species of the United States.

This plant is an epiphyte which grows upon other plants, especially koa (Acacia koa), olapa (Cheirodendron trigynum), and kawau (Ilex anomala). Each branch has three longitudinal rows of toothlike leaves.

Today the plant is known from just a few occurrences on the islands of Maui and Hawaii. It is historically known from Kauai, but it may be extirpated there. Threats to its existence include damage to its habitat by feral pigs, cattle, and Introduced plant species, and the fact that there are few individuals remaining.

References

External links
USDA Plants Profile

mannii
Endemic flora of Hawaii
Epiphytes